How to Stay at Home is a television series of animated shorts written and directed by Eric Goldberg and produced by Walt Disney Animation Studios. The series stars Bill Farmer and Corey Burton, and centers on Goofy as he is forced to stay in his home due to the COVID-19 pandemic. The three shorts were released on August 11, 2021, on Disney+.

Synopsis
Told in the style of the classic How to... series, the series follows Goofy's life in his home during the COVID-19 pandemic.

Cast
Bill Farmer as Goofy
Corey Burton as The Narrator

Episodes
All episodes were written and directed by Eric Goldberg.

Production

Development
During Fall 2020, animator Eric Goldberg pitched to Walt Disney Animation Studios chief creative officer Jennifer Lee and president Clark Spencer a series of shorts starring Goofy that centered on his life during the COVID-19 pandemic in the spirit of his How to... shorts, having been personally fond of the character. Lee and Spencer felt that Goofy's "everyman" persona was perfect to showcase regular life during the pandemic. The series was announced on July 26, 2021, with Goldberg set to direct and Dorothy McKim set to produce. Bill Farmer and Corey Burton reprise their roles from previous Disney media as Goofy and The Narrator. In addition to the three initial shorts, Goldberg pitched to Lee several additional ideas for How to Stay at Home shorts.

Animation
Contrary to most modern Walt Disney Animation Studios productions, the series was made with hand-drawn animation. Each short had a different supervising animator; Goldberg was the supervising animator for How to Wear a Mask, Randy Haycock for Learning to Cook, and Mark Henn for Binge Watching. Goldberg choose to animate How to Wear a Mask due to the short's use of physical humor, which he always was personally fond of. McKim assembled a 10-people team for the series. Due to the pandemic, the shorts were remotely produced, with technical director Brandon Bloch delivering scenes personally to the animators' homes after receiving them at Goldberg's home. While the shorts were inspired by the How to... Goofy shorts directed by Jack Kinney, the animators didn't wanted them to "feel like it came directly from 1942", so background artist Lureline Weatherly made backgrounds more detailed than those of the original shorts, and Goofy was given a slightly thicker outline in order for the animation to feel modern, while also evoking the original shorts.

Music and sound
The short series utilizes several sounds created by Jimmy McDonald for the original How to...  shorts. The sounds were selected according to Goldberg's preference, while McKim obtained the rights to use them.

Release
How to Stay at Home was released on Disney+, on August 11, 2021. The series consists of three shorts.

References

External links
 

2020s American animated television series
2021 American television series debuts
2021 American television series endings
American children's animated comedy television series
Disney animated television series
Disney+ original programming
English-language television shows
Mickey Mouse television series
Goofy (Disney) short films
Television shows about the COVID-19 pandemic